Decriminalised parking enforcement (DPE) is the name given in the United Kingdom to the civil enforcement of car parking regulations, carried out by civil enforcement officers, operating on behalf of a local authority. The Road Traffic Act 1991 (c. 40) provided for the decriminalisation of parking-related contraventions committed within controlled parking zones (CPZ) administered by local councils across the UK. The CPZs under the control of the local councils are also referred to as yellow routes and they can be easily identified with yellow lines marked on the roads with relevant time plates. Councils employ parking attendants to enforce their CPZs directly.

The chief rationale behind this provision within the Act was, amongst other reasons, to make sure people didn't end up being criminalised for car parking offences, like one may potentially become with some driving offences. However, some parking offences can still be enforced by the police with fines, failure to comply with which could lead to criminal proceedings and even the adding of points on the driving licence of the offender. Such parking offences enforced by police traffic wardens are parking contraventions committed in red routes (red routes are usually identified with red lines marked on the roads with the relevant time plates). Police traffic wardens can also enforce parked vehicles on pedestrian zig-zags/crossings, whether committed on red or yellow routes.

Background
With increasing problems of town centre congestion, and demand for on-street parking, coupled with the pressures on police resources, and the low priority given by some police forces to the enforcement of parking regulations, the Road Traffic Act 1991 permitted local authorities to apply for the legal powers to take over the enforcement of on-street, as well as off-street, car parking regulations from the police, in return they would be allowed to keep the proceeds.  Thus in areas where DPE has been granted, parking offences cease to be criminal offences.

Without DPE, fixed penalties (not fines, because the recipient can exercise their right to a Court hearing instead) from the issue of parking tickets by the police is collected by Fixed Penalty Offices (each of which is part of a local Magistrates' Court in each county or metropolitan area) and passed directly to central government.  With DPE in place, the local authority retains the income generated from parking penalties to finance parking enforcement and certain other activities such as local transport measures.  Local authorities have been able to charge for on-street parking since 1958, but without the effective enforcement provided by DPE, such charging was of limited effect.  Local authorities adopting DPE generally employ contractors to run their scheme.

The powers granted by DPE to deal with parking offences include:
 The issue of a Penalty Charge Notice (PCN) - a parking penalty which can be paid or contested by appeal (see below)
 The immobilisation of the vehicle - usually by clamping - until a release fee is paid
 The removal of the vehicle from the street

Appeals against council decisions on PCNs can be made to the London Tribunals (formerly the Parking and Traffic Appeals Service, PATAS) in London, the Traffic Penalty Tribunal (TPT) in England and Wales, the Scottish Parking Appeals Service in Scotland and the Northern Ireland Traffic Penalty Tribunal in Northern Ireland. These bodies are tribunals established under DPE; appeals against their decisions can generally be made only on points of law, through judicial review. They are independent of the councils, albeit being funded by them in England and Wales through a fee of 60p per PCN issued. In Northern Ireland the Tribunal is operated by the Northern Ireland Court Service and all PCNs are issued by the Department for Regional Development as opposed to local councils.

Revenue potential

Local authorities raise more than £1 billion a year from parking fines.
Some of the money raised goes into the costs of operating the system.  Local authorities must report their income from parking fines and charges and must also state what any surplus is spent on.  Typically the revenue from such schemes (if lost parking fees from infringing motorists are excluded) is greater than the cost of running the scheme and the surplus goes into the public purse, along with the parking fee income. The surplus revenue is ring-fenced to be used for transport related expenditure unless the Council is judged to be 'excellent' by the Audit Commission, in which case the surplus goes into the Council's general budget (as is the case for Kensington and Chelsea). In 2005/6 the City of Westminster received GBP 65.4 million in parking revenue for on-street parking. From one road in London, £3.2 million was raised in the year 2005-06.

Some councils have used, attempted to use or been accused of attempting to use parking enforcement as a source of revenue.

Benefits
Claimed benefits for DPE include:
 Less congestion due to lack of obstruction
 Higher turnover of parking spaces - thus easier to park
 Reduced pollution and fuel use  due to less circulating traffic and less congestion
 Safer streets due to less circulating traffic
 Improved emergency service access due to less obstructed streets
 Reduced demands on police resources

Reform
The summary of an inquiry into parking policy and
enforcement by the Transport Committee of the House of Commons states:

See also 
 Controlled parking zone
 Westminster motorcycle parking charge

Notes

References
 Parking Legislation - A History from the website of the National Parking Adjudication Service for England and Wales
 London Assembly Inquiry: Decriminalised parking enforcement from the RAC Foundation

External links
British Parking Association - Official website of the Member Association representing organisations in the Parking and Traffic Management Industry.
UK Parliament Transport Committee - Official website of the committee that examines the expenditure, administration and policy of the UK Department for Transport and its associated bodies
New Parking Laws UK - Concise information and advice regarding parking laws in the UK since the introduction of DPE in 2008.

Law enforcement in the United Kingdom
Local taxation in the United Kingdom
Parking law
Transport policy in the United Kingdom